Anže Berčič (born 25 November 1990) is a Slovenian slalom canoeist who has competed at the international level since 2008.

He won three medals in the C1 team event at the ICF Canoe Slalom World Championships with a gold in 2022, a silver in 2018 and a bronze in 2014. He also won two golds, a silver and a bronze in the same event at the European Championships.

World Cup individual podiums

References

External links

Living people
Slovenian male canoeists
1990 births
Sportspeople from Kranj
Medalists at the ICF Canoe Slalom World Championships